Henry Methvin (April 8, 1912 – April 19, 1948) was an American criminal, a bank robber, and a Depression-era outlaw. He is best remembered as the final member of Bonnie and Clyde's gang. His role in the gang has often been misattributed to teenage gang member W.D. Jones as both men were portrayed as composite character "C.W. Moss" in the film Bonnie and Clyde (1967).

Biography
Henry Methvin was born in Louisiana on April 8, 1912, to Ivan "Ivy" T. Methvin and Avie Stephens. He was serving a 10-year prison sentence at the Eastham prison farm in Huntsville, Texas when Bonnie and Clyde came to break out Raymond Hamilton on January 16, 1934; one guard was killed and another wounded in the jailbreak. In the confusion, Methvin and three other inmates took the opportunity to escape with Hamilton. Though Hamilton initially ordered them to go back, Clyde welcomed the convicts and offered to let them join the gang. Though the three men chose to take their chances alone, Methvin accepted Clyde's offer to stay. He remained with the gang until their end five months later.

A month after the breakout, Methvin joined Hamilton and Barrow in stealing guns and ammunition from a National Guard armory in Ranger, Texas, under the cover of darkness on February 19. Eight days later, the men used the weapons to steal $4,138 from a bank in Lancaster. Bonnie and Clyde agreed to drive Methvin to visit his father near Gibsland, Louisiana, on March 1. Methvin was present when, the following month, the gang shot and killed Texas state troopers E.B. Wheeler and H.D. Murphy on April 1, 1934. Conflicting reports from relatives and alleged eyewitnesses have implicated each of the four gang members. Barrow himself was inconsistent on who he believed was the shooter. He wrote to relatives blaming Methvin, who he claimed had misunderstood Barrow’s suggestion that they "take" the troopers, meaning to disarm and take them for a "joyride", and instead opened fire. In a later letter to authorities, however, Barrow named Hamilton as the killer.

Regardless of Methvin's role, he was part of another of the gang's murder five days later. On April 6, their car became stuck in mud near Commerce, Oklahoma. While trying to get the car moving, they were surprised by two local officers out on patrol and fired at them. Constable Cal Campbell was killed, and Police Chief Percy Boyd was wounded. Boyd was then taken hostage by the gang and later released at Mangle Corner, near Fort Scott, Kansas. The next day, while eating at a cafe in Stillwater, they abruptly left when a patrolman passed by. Methvin and the gang  remained on the run for the next few months.

On April 30, Methvin took part in a Kansas bank robbery with the Barrow gang, joined by Joe Palmer, and they escaped with $2,800. On May 1, the gang was identified in a bank robbery in Sac City, Iowa, and two days later they took $700 from a bank in Everly. They then traveled south to meet relatives in Dallas on May 6, and then another family meeting with Methvin's father in Louisiana. On May 19, Methvin was sent into a diner to get sandwiches for the gang. While he was still at the counter, a police car passed the diner, and Clyde drove off, leaving Methvin behind. He hitchhiked to Ruston, where his parents were living at the time. 

According to most versions of the story, Methvin told his father that the gang had planned a spot for a rendezvous in the event that any of the gang were separated. Methvin was supposed to meet the gang on a deserted stretch of highway south of Arcadia. Ivan Methvin, then being harassed by lawmen in pursuit of his son and the rest of the gang, was alleged to have given this information to Louisiana sheriff Henderson Jordan, who then passed it on to Texas Ranger Frank Hamer. In exchange, Methvin was promised that his son would not get the death penalty for the murders of Troopers Wheeler and Murphy in Grapevine, Texas two months earlier. It is unclear whether Henry Methvin was aware of this arrangement. 

On May 23, 1934, Ivan Methvin parked his truck near the meeting spot and removed one of the wheels as if changing a flat tire. When Bonnie and Clyde stopped to assist Methvin, Hamer gave the signal and his 6-man posse fired, killing both of them. An alternate scenario in the 1990s, supposedly suppressed for over 60 years, claimed that Ivan Methvin had been forced to go along with the ambush. He was stopped by lawmen on the highway and tied to a tree while his truck was disabled in order to lure Bonnie and Clyde.  

Although Henry Methvin avoided the Grapevine murders, his arrangement did not preclude prosecution for the Oklahoma murder of Constable Campbell. While he was locked up in the county jail, he and another fellow prisoner tried to escape by overpowering the jailer. The plan was they would rush the jailer and the other person would stab the jailer to death with a large pocket knife they earlier concealed in their cell. The jailer, a Seneca Cayuga Native American man by the name of Tom Armstrong overpowered Methvin and the escape was foiled. Another inmate helped the jailer by securing the other prisoner until Armstrong was able to detain Methvin. Methvin spent the rest of his time in the hole until he stood trial and was found guilty of the officer's murder and sentenced to death on December 20, 1935. His sentence was commuted to life imprisonment on September 18, 1936, and he was paroled on March 20, 1942. Methvin continued to remain in trouble with the law. In November 1945, he was jailed for fighting and carrying a shotgun. He was arrested again for attempted robbery and drunk driving near Shreveport, Louisiana eleven months later. On April 19, 1948, Methvin was intoxicated while attempting to cross a railroad track and was killed by an oncoming train. Although it has been speculated that his death was retribution for the deaths of Bonnie and Clyde, especially after the similar death of his father Ivan 16 months earlier, no evidence of foul play has ever been produced.

In modern popular culture

Television
Garrett Kruithof portrayed Henry Methvin in the 2013 mini-series Bonnie & Clyde, which aired on Lifetime, the History Channel and A&E on December 8 and 9, 2013. 

Billy Wickman portrayed Methvin in the 2016 Timeless first season episode "Last Ride of Bonnie & Clyde", which aired on NBC on December 5, 2016.

Jake Dashnaw portrayed Methvin in the 2019 Netflix film The Highwaymen. Additionally, W. Earl Brown portrayed his father, Ivan Methvin in the movie.

References

External links
Henry Methvin
Henry Methvin at TexasHideout.com
Clyde Barrow & Henry Methvin at EmmetLabs.com

Henry Methvin at Internet Movie Database (Archive version from 2016-03-11)

1912 births
1948 deaths
Accidental deaths in Louisiana
American bank robbers
Depression-era gangsters
Criminals from Louisiana
Barrow Gang
Railway accident deaths in the United States
Road incident deaths in Louisiana